Thomas Brandl (born 9 February 1969) is a German ice hockey player. He competed in the men's tournaments at the 1992 Winter Olympics, the 1994 Winter Olympics and the 1998 Winter Olympics.

Career statistics

Regular season and playoffs

International

References

External links
 

1969 births
Living people
Olympic ice hockey players of Germany
Ice hockey players at the 1992 Winter Olympics
Ice hockey players at the 1994 Winter Olympics
Ice hockey players at the 1998 Winter Olympics
People from Bad Tölz
Sportspeople from Upper Bavaria